Ulipuram is a village in Gangavalli taluk, Salem district, Tamil Nadu, India, and has been since at least the 16th century, when it was known as Puliyarampur. The village consists of various castes. Marriamman Kovil makes up the village's center, named for the prominently worshiped goddess Marriamman, established by village people. The village is historically known for agriculture, sheep, goat and cow breeding. Mainly Vanniyars,  Nayakkars, Kurumbars and Kavundars castes makes up much of this village.

Ulipuram is a predominantly agricultural community with major crops including rice, nuts, sugarcane, and corn.

Residences are centralized around the area's surrounding farms, subdividing Ulipuram into groups and localities including Eecha Oodai, kulimeduthottam near Raja Hariprasath sir's house, Annaikattu, Vembarasu, Ulipuram Pudur, Mettutheru, KalanKaradu, Thonthi Pillayar Kovil, Andi Kuttai, NariKaradu, Nallathangal Kuttai, Nandukitan Pudur, Mankaradu, VisamoongilKuttai, KuttiKaradu, and Bonthupuli Kadu.

Historically, Ulipuram receives ample rainfall which helps its agricultural activity. However, since 1996 there's been a reduced rainfall and farming has been severely affected. Hence, some farmers began seeking livelihood in other sectors of the economy.

Temples 
 Marriamman Kovil (Ulipuram)
 Vinayagar Kovil
 Piddariammam kovil
 Murugan kovil
 Thonthipillayar kovil
 Pambalaamman Kovil
 Perumal kovil
 varunabaghavaan kovil
 sivan kovil ulipuram
 Nallathangal Kovil ulipuram

Main crops 
 Paddy
 Turmeric
 Tapioca
 Corn
 Sugarcane
 Ground nut
 Banana
 Coconut
 Vegetables

Work 
 Agriculture
 Sago factories
 Cattle breeding
 Heavy motor vehicle drivers
 Bore well operators

List of Areas in Ulipuram 
 kulimeduthottam Raja HARIPRASATH 
 Anaikattu
 Ulipuram Pudur
 Vembarasu
 Mettutheru
 KalanKaradu
 Thonthi Pillayar Kovil
 Andi Kuttai
 NariKaradu
 Nallathangal Kuttai
 Nandukitan Pudur
 Mankaradu
 VisamoongilKuttai
 KuttiKaradu
 Bonthupuli Kadu
 EEchaodai

Factory 
 Sri ganabathi gloves knitting

Government Schools 
 Panchayath Union primary school (Ulipuram)
 Panchayath Union higher secondary school (Ulipuram)
 Panchayath Union primary school (Kalankaradu)
 Panchayath Union primary school (Echaoodai)
 Panchayath Union primary school (Pudhur)
 Few preschools (Sathunavu Pallikodam)

Private Schools 
 Saraswathi Matriculation School

Banks 

 Lakshmi Vilas Bank
 Primary Agricultural Cooperative Society

ATM 
 India 1 ATM

References

Villages in Salem district